The Air-Sport Pasat is a family of Polish single-place, paragliders, designed and produced by Air-Sport of Zakopane.

Design and development
The Pasat is named after a trade wind. It was designed as a recreational glider and was noted in 2003 as being very competitively priced.

The design has progressed through four generations of models, the Pasat, Pasat 2, 3 and 4, each improving on the last. The models are each named for their wing area in square metres.

Variants
Pasat 26
Small-sized model for lighter pilots.
Pasat 28
Mid-sized model for medium-weight pilots. This glider model is AFNOR certified.
Pasat 30
Large-sized model for heavier pilots.
Pasat 4 26
Small-sized model for lighter pilots. The glide ratio is 8:1.
Pasat 4 28
Mid-sized model for medium-weight pilots. The glide ratio is 8:1.
Pasat 4 30
Large-sized model for heavier pilots. The glide ratio is 8:1.

Specifications (Pasat 28)

References

External links

Pasat
Paragliders